"Dancin' Man" is a song by disco group Q, written by Rob Peckman. It reached the Top 40 of the Billboard Hot 100, and received substantial play in the American Southeast.

Release 
"Dancin' Man" was released by Epic Records in Spring 1977. The song's B-side was titled "Love Pollution." To promote the song, Epic Records took out a full-page advertisement in the April 23, 1977 issue of Billboard magazine, urging DJs and radio stations to put the song into rotation.

Airplay 
The song went into rotation on many Southeast American radio stations, including: 
WQXI (Atlanta) 
WBBQ (Atlanta) 
WBJW-FM (Orlando)
WMFJ (Daytona Beach).

The song also received play on: 
KCPX (Salt Lake City)
WTRY (Albany)
KTNQ (Los Angeles).

Charts 
The song was a Top 40 hit on the Billboard Hot 100 (where it reached number 23), the Cashbox Singles chart (#20), and the Record World chart.  In Canada, "Dancin' Man" reached #19.

Chart history

Weekly charts

Year-end charts

References

External links 
 Hear the song on YouTube

1977 songs
1977 singles
Disco songs
Epic Records singles